Sabit Mukanov (Sábıt Muqanuly Muqanov; April 26, 1900 – 18 April 1973) was a Kazakh poet, social activist, and academic. He was the head of the Writers' Union of Kazakhstan from 1936-37 and again from 1943-52.

Sabit Mukanov was born to a Muslim family in 1900 in Tauzar Volost of Akmola Gubernia (now North Kazakhstan Province). His family worked mostly as cattle ranchers and took part in the civil war from 1918-1920. He studied in the Institute of Red Professorship from 1930 to 1935. Mukanov's earliest novels were Son of Bai (1928), Pure Love (1931), and Temirtas (Iron Stone) (1935).

Mukanov was the author of several novels, such as Botagoz, Syrdaria, and the autobiographical trilogy School of life. Mukanov studied the history and theory of literature, especially Kazakh literature of the 19th and 20th centuries, such as the works of Kazakh prose writers and poets Saken Seifullin, Mukhtar Auezov, Tair Zharokov, and Abdilda Tazhibayev. He also researched the scientific and literary heritage of Shokan Ualikhanov and Abay Qunanbayuli and was the first to expound the life and works of the great Kazakh poet Zhambyl Zhabayev. In 1974 his ethnographic work "National Heritage" was published posthumously, which included research about ancient folk traditions, shezhire, the economy and life of pre-revolutionary Kazakhs, and their material and spiritual life.

He died in 1973 in Almaty, Kazakhstan. The Museum Complex of S. Mukanov and G. Musrepov is in Almaty.

Awards 
Premium of Academy of Science of Kazakh SSR named after Shokan Ualikhanov (1966)
State premium of Kazakh SSR named after Abay Qunanbayuli
Lenin Award (twice)
Labor Red Standard award (twice)
Symbol of Honour award

References

1900 births
1973 deaths
Kazakh-language poets
Kazakhstani academics
20th-century poets
People from North Kazakhstan Region

Soviet writers
Institute of Red Professors alumni